Ana Khatun (also Romanized as Ānā Khātūn and Anakhatoon) is a village in Esperan Rural District of the Central District of Tabriz County, East Azerbaijan province, Iran. At the 2006 National Census, its population was 2,052 in 527 households. The following census in 2011 counted 6,812 people in 1,884 households. The latest census in 2016 showed a population of 8,288 people in 2,368 households; it was the largest village in its rural district.

References 

Tabriz County

Populated places in East Azerbaijan Province

Populated places in Tabriz County